The Journal of Research in Music Education was established in 1953 under the editorship of Allen Britton. At first many of the articles described historical and descriptive research, but in the early 1960s the journal began to shift toward experimental research. The Society for Research in Music Education was established in 1960 and the Journal of Research in Music Education became its official publication in 1963. The journal is currently published by SAGE Publications in association with the National Association for Music Education.

Scope
The Journal of Research in Music Education publishes reports of original research related to music teaching and learning. The journal covers topics such as music pedagogy, history, and philosophy, and addresses vocal, instrumental, and general music at all levels, from early childhood through to adult.

Abstracting and indexing
The Journal of Research in Music Education is abstracted and indexed in the following databases:
 Academic Complete
 Academic Premier
 Arts & Humanities Citation Index
 Educational Research Abstracts Online
 ERIC
 Wilson Education Index/Abstracts

See also
Research in Music Education

References
Mark, M. L., & Gary, C. L. (1999). A history of American music education (2nd ed.). Reston, VA: MENC—The National Association for Music Education.

External links
Society for Research in Music Education

Music education journals
English-language journals
Publications established in 1953
Quarterly journals
SAGE Publishing academic journals